Jacqueline "Jay" Fuchs (born July 31, 1971) is a Swiss professional female bodybuilder. Her achievements in various competitions has led pundits to regard her as one of the "ten best female bodybuilders in the world".

In July 2016, Fuchs won that year's edition of the IFBB Chicago Pro. The victory qualified her to vie for the crown of professional female bodybuilding at the Rising Phoenix World Championships that September. Fuchs placed 12th overall.

Contest history
2018
 IFBB Chicago Pro Championships - 3rd
 IFBB Lenda Murray Pro - 1st
 IFBB WOS Rising Phoenix World Championships - 11th

2017
 IFBB Tampa Pro - 5th

2016
 2016 IFBB Wings of Strength Rising Phoenix World Championships – 12th
Wings of Strength Chicago Pro
Bodybuilding: IFBB Pro Women (1st)

Wings of Strength Chicago Pro
Bodybuilding: MGL Best Poser Award

2015
IFBB Tampa Pro
Bodybuilding: Wings of Strength Best Poser	
IFBB Tampa Pro
Bodybuilding: IFBB Pro Women (5th)

2012
 Arnold Amateur Europe
Bodybuilding: Women Bodybuilding (1st)

References

1971 births
Living people
Professional bodybuilders
Sportspeople from Zürich
Swiss female bodybuilders